Michael Palmer (born October 31, 1980) is a former Canadian football wide receiver. He has played with the Toronto Argonauts and the Saskatchewan Roughriders.  He has won 2 Grey Cups in 2004 and 2007. He went to school at Crestwicke Christian Academy and University of Guelph. Palmer is the son of former BC Lions linebacker Peter Palmer and former Canadian Olympic gymnast Jennifer Diachun-Palmer.

References

External links
CFL.ca profile
ChampionsInLife.ca (Michael Palmer's website)

1980 births
Canadian people of Ukrainian descent
Guelph Gryphons football players
Living people
People from Richmond, British Columbia
Players of Canadian football from British Columbia
Saskatchewan Roughriders players
Toronto Argonauts players